Clara Cynthia Benson (1875–1964) was a Canadian chemist, the sole female founder of the American Society for Biological Chemistry (now the American Society for Biochemistry and Molecular Biology (ASBMB)) and one of the first two women to earn a Ph.D. from the University of Toronto (U of T) (the other being philosophy student Emma Baker). She later became one of U of T's first two female associate professors. Trained in physical chemistry, she switched focus to biochemistry when lack of job opportunities for female chemists led her to take a position teaching food chemistry as part of U of T's Domestic Science program. She also played a large role in the development of U of T's women's athletics program.

Early life and education 
Clara Cynthia Benson was born in Port Hope, Ontario, Canada June 5, 1875 to Thomas Moore Benson and Laura Abigail Fuller. Laura and Thomas, a widowed businessman, lawyer, and judge, had three children together and additionally raised two daughters from Thomas' first marriage. Clara attended Port Hope High School then entered University College of the University of Toronto (U of T) in 1895 to study chemistry, mathematics and physics. This was only one year after the school began admitting women, and women were still not allowed into the school's reading rooms and were denied access to the library catalogues.

Benson graduated with a Bachelor of Arts in chemistry from U of T in 1899 (the first woman to do so) and continued straight into PhD studies. She earned her doctorate in 1903, making her one of the first two women to earn a Ph.D. from the University of Toronto (U of T) (the other being philosophy student Emma Baker).

Benson's doctoral research, supervised by William Lash Miller, examined reaction rates of inorganic salt solutions. Her thesis, The rates of the reactions in solutions containing ferrous sulphate, potassium iodide, and chromic acid was published in the Journal of Physical Chemistry (JPC) in May, 1903.

Career and research 
Benson's early research was in the field of physical chemistry, with an emphasis on reaction rates of inorganic salt solutions. Her 1902 article "The Rate of Oxidation of Ferrous Salts by Chromic Acid" may make her the second female author (after Marie Curie) to publish in the Journal of Physical Chemistry (JPC).

As a woman, she had difficulty finding a job as a physical chemist after graduating, so she took a position as a demonstrator in food science at U of T's new Lillian Massey School of Domestic Science. She objected to this program's goal of preparing women to be housewives and had even signed a petition organized by University College's Women's Alumnae Association in 1902 questioning the program's introduction. At the time, however, food chemistry was one of the chemistry sub-fields with better professional opportunities for women.

This position involved switching from U of T's Chemistry Department to their Physiology (Physiological Chemistry) Department, where she was mentored by the "Father of the Medical School at Toronto," A.B. Macallum. Her subsequent research included biochemical examinations of fluid and tissue composition.

When food science was incorporated into U of T's medical curriculum in 1905, Benson was promoted to lecturer in physiological chemistry (biochemistry), making her the first woman at U of T to achieve a rank above demonstrator. In 1906, a royal commission report led to the creation of the Faculty of Household Science, of which Benson and the principal, Annie Laird, became associate professors, making them U of T's first female professors. Benson helped develop the school's food chemistry program and, in 1926, was promoted to full professor and head of the Department of Food Chemistry (a position she held until her retirement as professor emeritus in 1945).

Starting in 1915, she conducted summer studies at St. Andrews Biological Station examining the chemistry of seafood. At the request of Canada's Ministry of Marine and Fisheries, which was trying to build consumer demand for fish, she organized a group of food scientists from Canadian universities to work to improve fish preparation methods.

During World War I she developed and organized a course of instruction on ways to adapt food chemistry analysis techniques to explosives. These methods were adopted by munitions laboratories, helping standardized their production steps.

She was sole female founder of the American Society for Biological Chemistry (now the American Society for Biochemistry and Molecular Biology (ASBMB)) when it formed in December, 1906.

Other interests and later life 
Benson advocated for the development of women's athletics at the University of Toronto, co-chairing a committee on the matter and serving as the first president of the Women's Athletic Association from 1921 until her retirement. She sat on a committee of female faculty members formed in 1928 to fight for the creation of a women's athletic facility. When U of T opened their first women's gymnasium in 1959, they named it the Benson Building in her honor.

Benson served on the national board of the YWCA (Young Women's Christian Association), chairing their Foreign Committee, and her work with the organization led her to sponsor two French World War II orphans after her retirement. Her hobbies included stamp-collecting and traveling. She also enjoyed film-making, and videos she took while on some of her travels are housed at U of T's archives.

She was colleagues and friends with biochemist Maud Menten, who was also trained by Archibald Macallum.

Benson never married nor had children, and after retiring in 1945, she returned to Port Hope where she died March 24, 1964 (aged 89).

Honors and awards 
Benson was elected a fellow of the Canadian Institute of Chemistry in 1919, but was not allowed to attend their Annual Dinner in 1920 because she was a woman.

She was listed in the 1920s' American Men in Science.

U of T's Household Science alumnae created a fellowship in her honor in 1950 and hung a portrait of her by Yousef Karsh in the Household Science building.

In 1992, the Canadian Society of Chemistry created the annually-awarded Clara Benson Award to honor female chemists working in Canada.

In 2003, U of T celebrated the 100 year anniversary of her PhD achievement with a day of celebrations including a reenactment of her thesis defense.

Selected publications

References

External links 

 Clara Cynthia Benson archival papers held at the University of Toronto Archives and Records Management Services

20th-century Canadian women scientists
Canadian biochemists
Women biochemists
Canadian women chemists
Canadian women biologists
20th-century Canadian chemists
20th-century Canadian biologists